Whiskeytown was an unincorporated community in Shasta County, California, United States. Although once a bustling mining town, it was flooded to make way for Whiskeytown Lake in 1962, now part of Whiskeytown–Shasta–Trinity National Recreation Area. All that remains is the relocated store, a few residences, mostly occupied by National Recreation Area personnel, and old mines that are above the water level of the lake. Whiskeytown is registered as a California Historical Landmark.

History
Whiskeytown was one of Shasta County's first gold mining settlements during the California Gold Rush of 1849, though at the time it was called Whiskey Creek Diggings. There are two different stories for how the settlement got its name: The first states that a barrel of whiskey fell from a pack mule and into the creek that ran by Whiskeytown; the second attributes the name to the legend that miners at Whiskeytown could drink a barrel of the hard liquor a day.

The area became known as a source for gold. The Redding Record Searchlight reports miners averaged $50 in gold per day, and in 1851 a 56-ounce gold nugget was found. The first woman arrived in town in 1852, and by 1855, about 1,000 gold miners lived in Whiskeytown. The post office was opened in 1856, but the federal government didn't allow the Whiskeytown name to be attached to it because it was considered inappropriate. Finally, in 1952, the federal government agreed to name the post office after the town.

Construction of the Whiskeytown Dam began in 1960, and the basin began to fill with water in 1962. Some Whiskeytown buildings were moved to higher ground, but others remain underwater. The dam was dedicated by President John F. Kennedy in 1963.

Present day
Today, what was once a bustling mining town is a popular lake and recreation area. Whiskeytown Lake, part of the Central Valley Project, draws people looking to swim, sail, kayak, or fish, among other activities. On clear days, the outlines of buildings that were once Whiskeytown can be seen at the bottom of the lake, according to the Redding Record Searchlight.

Whiskeytown Cemetery was moved during the construction of the dam. All the graves were exhumed and transported to higher ground. Today, Whiskeytown Cemetery is maintained by locals and is somewhat of a hidden tourist destination as well, due to its unusual and festive decor. Graves are decorated with flowers as well as trinkets such as toys or the deceased's favorite snacks or cocktails.

References

Unincorporated communities in California
Former settlements in Shasta County, California
Ghost towns in California
1962 disestablishments in California
Populated places disestablished in 1962